Chaubier is a washed rind French Cheese made from half goat's milk and half cow's milk.  The cheese was produced by the Soignon division of DCI's cheese section.  The cheese was discontinued in 2012 with small amounts of the cheese being available in 2013 from distributors.

DCI has discontinued all references to the cheese on their website as of 1/1/2013.

References
 http://www.nalascheese.com/store/Cheese/Cheese-Type/Firm-Cheese/Chaubier/
 http://www.igourmet.com/shoppe/Chaubier.asp
 http://www.crackerscheese.com/home/chaubier

French cheeses
Goat's-milk cheeses
Cow's-milk cheeses